Phymata pacifica is a species of ambush bug in the family Reduviidae. It is found in North America.

Subspecies
These three subspecies belong to the species Phymata pacifica:
 Phymata pacifica hainesi Kormilev, 1962
 Phymata pacifica pacifica Evans, 1931
 Phymata pacifica stanfordi Evans, 1931

References

Further reading

 

Reduviidae
Articles created by Qbugbot
Insects described in 1931